Azadshahr County, formerly Shahpasand, is in Golestan province, Iran. The capital of the county is the city of Azadshahr. At the 2006 census, the county's population was 88,251 in 21,188 households. The following census in 2011 counted 91,767 people in 25,343 households. At the 2016 census, the county's population was 96,803 in 28,965 households.

Administrative divisions

The population history of Azadshahr County's administrative divisions over three consecutive censuses is shown in the following table. The latest census shows two districts, four rural districts, and three cities.

References

 

Counties of Golestan Province